Vinça is a commune in the Pyrénées-Orientales department in southern France.

Geography 
Vinça is located in the canton of Le Canigou and in the arrondissement of Prades.

Population

Transport
The N116 road passes close to the north of Vinça village.

Vinça railway station is on TER Occitanie line 24 (Villefranche-Vernet-les-Bains – Perpignan).

See also
Communes of the Pyrénées-Orientales department

References

Communes of Pyrénées-Orientales